Cecidonia is a genus of lichenicolous fungi in the family Lecideaceae. It has two species. The genus was circumscribed in 1988 by Dagmar Triebel and Gerhard Rambold, with C. umbonella assigned as the type species.

References

Lecideales
Lecideales genera
Lichenicolous fungi
Taxa described in 1988